JW3, also known as Jewish Community Centre London, is an arts, culture and entertainment venue, an educational facility  and a social and community hub in north London. It is located at 341–351 Finchley Road, London, and opened on 29 September 2013. "Describing itself as a new postcode for Jewish life", the name "JW3" is a wordplay on its postal address, which is in the NW3 postcode area.

Vivien Duffield, whose idea it was, contributed £40m of the project's £50m cost – over the 10 years it took to bring it to reality – through the Clore Duffield Foundation. It was inspired by her 2003 visit to the Jewish Community Centre in Manhattan, New York.

Facilities
The 35,000 square foot building, which includes a 270-seat auditorium, a 60-seat cinema, a restaurant and bar, a demonstration kitchen, dance studios, classrooms and medical consultation rooms, was designed by Lifschutz Davidson Sandilands. The JW3 campus sits on half an acre of land and includes the community centre/arts venue, an outdoor piazza and a tower block of apartments and offices.

JW3 and the London Jewish Cultural Centre (LJCC) merged in March 2015, forming a single, enhanced organisation based at the JW3 site on Finchley Road.

Organisation
JW3's chief executive is Raymond Simonson, former Executive Director of Limmud, who succeeded Nick Viner.
Marc Nohr is also the Chairman of JW3.

JW3 is run by the Jewish Community Centre for London, a charitable organisation that aims to provide a way into, or back into, active Jewish life for all of London’s Jewish community.

The organisation runs a wide programme of events that it launched in 2005. These target all members of the community, irrespective of affiliation or level of observance. Held in various venues across London, the programme aims to be inclusive and is not religious, instead using its events to provide a gateway into Jewish life and foster a cohesive community.

Events programme 
JW3 runs a programme of social, cultural and educational events that mix audiences, age groups and content, encouraging experimentation with ideas and attempting to engage people in new issues.

Previous arts and culture events have ranged from modern interpretations of art and music gigs (e.g. an Idan Raichel Project concert) to events such as Kvetch choir (the complaints choir) that encourages people to enjoy their own creativity and a singalong with the pensioner pop group "The Zimmers".

Books-based events have included discussions on books related to the community, with guest author appearances, and debates on topics such as "Has the Left Lost its Way?".

Social action events have included Mitzvah Day and an initiative in 2007 to bring Jewish and Muslim communities together.

In November 2014 JW3 launched the first ever UK Jewish Comedy Festival, an annual festival celebrating the best in Jewish comedy. Guests have included Ruby Wax, David Baddiel and Stephen Tobolowsky.

In March 2017 JW3 ran a programme of LGBTQ+ related events, marking the 50th anniversary of the Sexual Offences Act (which effectively decriminalised homosexuality in England and Wales).  This "GAYW3" programme caused a backlash from a number of rabbis of the Orthodox Jewish community, led by Rabbi Bassous. In July 2017, Rabbi Bassous issued a notice, signed by 6 other rabbis calling on their communities to distance themselves from JW3. At the end of November 2017, Rabbi Bassous reissued the letter, this time signed by 25 Orthodox rabbis of North West London.

Notable guests 
 David Beckham 
 Grayson Perry 
 David McAlmont
 Zoë Wanamaker
 Emilia Kabakov 
 Vanessa Kirby 
 Richard Curtis 
 Jacques Attali 
 Lawrence Summers 
 Tracy Ann Oberman 
 Dominic Grieve 
 Garry Kasparov 
 Ruby Wax 
 David Baddiel 
 Anselm Kiefer 
 Mike Milken
 John Landis 
 Rabbi Lord Jonathan Sacks 
 Dr. Ben S. Bernanke 
 Nigella Lawson 
 Kevin Spacey 
 Rabbi Adin Steinsaltz
 David Schneider
 Idan Raichel
 Ed Balls 
 Chris Grayling 
 Jeremy Corbyn 
 Michael Gove 
 Nicole Farhi 
 Simon Schama
 Emily Maitlis
 Alan Yentob
 Sue Perkins
 Theresa May
 Howard Jacobson
 Achinoam Nini

The Alan Howard Foundation / JW3 Speaker Series 
The Alan Howard Foundation / JW3 Speaker Series features conversations, talks and entertainment delivered by leaders and experts in their respective fields who can provide a unique insight into their chosen topics. The lectures are designed to cover broad areas of intellectual thought, including economics, science, history, politics and the arts. The principal aims of the series are to educate and entertain through high level conversation and debate, whilst delivering a rich, diverse and inspiring range of speaking events.

Sounds Jewish podcast 
JW3's monthly podcast, Sounds Jewish, produced in partnership with The Guardian, is a monthly magazine-style programme hosted by Jason Solomons.  Each "episode" is about 30 minutes in length and many of them are featured on The Guardian's podcast homepage.

References

External links 
 JW3
 JW3 London at architects Lifschutz Davidson Sandilands' website
 The JCC London
 Sounds Jewish podcast
 "JW3: is London's latest cultural centre 'a new postcode for Jewish life'?"
 The JCC London Blog
 JCCs of North America

2013 establishments in England
Community centres in London
Jewish Community Center
Jewish organisations based in the United Kingdom
Jews and Judaism in London